The Protolepidodendrales are an extinct order of lycopsids that flourished from the Devonian to the lower Carboniferous (Mississippian) periods.

Leclercqia is one of the best-known genera. Protolepidodendropsis is another genus included in this order.

References

Prehistoric lycophytes
Prehistoric plant orders